Rodney Village is a census-designated place (CDP) in Kent County, Delaware, United States. It is part of the Dover, Delaware Metropolitan Statistical Area. The population was 1,487 at the 2010 census.

Geography
Rodney Village is located at  (39.1320569, -75.5324240).

Demographics

In 2010, Rodney Village had a population of 1,487 people. The racial makeup of the CDP was 38.9% White, 49.3% African American, 0.6% Native American, 4.2% Asian, 0.0% Pacific Islander, 2.4% from other races, and 4.6% from two or more races. 7.0% of the population were Hispanic or Latino of any race.

As of the census of 2000, there were 1,602 people, 596 households, and 413 families residing in the CDP. The racial makeup of the CDP was 49.13% White, 38.83% African American, 0.75% Native American, 4.00% Asian, 1.62% from other races, and 5.68% from two or more races. Hispanic or Latino of any race were 6.24% of the population.

There were 596 households, out of which 32.0% had children under the age of 18 living with them, 43.1% were married couples living together, 19.6% had a female householder with no husband present, and 30.7% were non-families. 21.6% of all households were made up of individuals, and 7.4% had someone living alone who was 65 years of age or older.  The average household size was 2.62 and the average family size was 3.06.

In the CDP, the population was spread out, with 26.1% under the age of 18, 13.7% from 18 to 24, 27.7% from 25 to 44, 21.3% from 45 to 64, and 11.2% who were 65 years of age or older.  The median age was 34 years. For every 100 females, there were 100.0 males.  For every 100 females age 18 and over, there were 97.3 males.

The median income for a household in the CDP was $40,875, and the median income for a family was $41,767. Males had a median income of $28,676 versus $23,750 for females. The per capita income for the CDP was $15,946.  About 5.1% of families and 8.1% of the population were below the poverty line, including 11.3% of those under age 18 and 7.8% of those age 65 or over.

Education
Rodney Village is located in the Caesar Rodney School District. Residents are zoned to W. Reilly Brown Elementary School in Dover, and in turn those zoned to Brown are zoned to Fred Fifer III Middle School in Camden. Caesar Rodney High School in Camden is the comprehensive high school for the entire district.

References

Census-designated places in Kent County, Delaware
Census-designated places in Delaware